Charles Edward Stuart may refer to:
Charles Edward Stuart (1720–1788), 18th century claimant to the title 'Prince of Wales' also known as Bonnie Prince Charlie
Charles Edward Stuart, Count Roehenstart ( – 1854), the aforementioned pretender's illegitimate grandson
Charles E. Stuart (1810–1887), Michigan politician and US senator
Charles E. Stuart (Virginia politician) (1850–1889)

See also
Charles Stuart (disambiguation)